Granitovo is a village in Vidin Province in northwestern Bulgaria. It is located in the municipality of Belogradchik. 

Its population in 2010 was 61.

Points of interest
 Tsankino Vrelo cave

References

Sources
 Michev Nicholas & Peter Koledarov. "Dictionary of settlements and settlement names in Bulgaria 1878-1987", Sofia, 1989.

External links
 Vidin-online

Villages in Vidin Province
Belogradchik Municipality